Tavon Rooks (born May 10, 1990) is a former American football offensive tackle. He was drafted by the New Orleans Saints in the sixth round of the 2014 NFL draft. He played college football at Kansas State.

College career
Rooks attended Navarro Junior College before transferring to Kansas State.

Professional career

New Orleans Saints
Rooks was selected by the New Orleans Saints in the 6th round of the 2014 NFL Draft. On August 30, 2014, he was waived by the Saints. On September 1, 2014, he was signed to the Saints' practice squad.

Arizona Cardinals
On January 5, 2015, Rooks was signed to a reserve/future contract by the Arizona Cardinals. On June 5, 2015, he was released by the Cardinals.

Kansas City Chiefs
On June 16, 2015, Rooks was signed by the Kansas City Chiefs. During spring training in August 2015, Rooks suffered a heart attack during practice. A few days later he had stents inserted. He was placed on the medical IR. On September 1, 2015, he was released by the Chiefs.

References

External links
2014 draft profile

1990 births
Living people
American football offensive tackles
Kansas State Wildcats football players
New Orleans Saints players
Players of American football from Baltimore
Arizona Cardinals players
Kansas City Chiefs players